Jean-Marc Tennberg (1924–1971) was a French film, stage and television actor. He played a number of supporting roles in post-war French cinema. He was also a poet known for his television recitals.

Selected filmography
 Cyrano de Bergerac (1946)
 The Ideal Couple (1946)
 Monsieur Vincent (1947)
 The Unknown Singer (1947)
 The Gamblers (1950)
 The Cape of Hope (1951)
 Rue des Saussaies (1951)
 Fanfan la Tulipe (1952)
 Adorable Creatures (1952)
 Are We All Murderers? (1952)
 The Moment of Truth (1952)
 The Road to Damascus (1952)
 The Lottery of Happiness (1953)
 The Three Musketeers (1953)
 Faites-moi confiance (1954)
 Madame du Barry (1954)
 The Beautiful Otero (1954)
 La Bande à papa (1956)
 Women's Club (1956)
 Law of the Streets (1956)
 Une ravissante idiote (1964)
 Hot Frustrations (1965)

References

Bibliography
 Andrew, Dudley (ed.) Andre Bazin's New Media. University of California Press,  2014.

External links

1924 births
1971 deaths
French male stage actors
French male film actors
French male television actors
People from  Pantin